Lima zealandica is a species of bivalve mollusc in the family Limidae.

Distribution
This species is endemic to New Zealand.

References 

 Marwick, J. (1924). Palaeontological notes on some Pliocene Mollusca from Hawke's Bay. Transactions of the New Zealand Institute. 55: 191-201.
 Powell A. W. B., New Zealand Mollusca, William Collins Publishers Ltd, Auckland, New Zealand 1979 
 Spencer, H.G., Marshall, B.A. & Willan, R.C. (2009). Checklist of New Zealand living Mollusca. Pp 196-219. in: Gordon, D.P. (ed.) New Zealand inventory of biodiversity. Volume one. Kingdom Animalia: Radiata, Lophotrochozoa, Deuterostomia. Canterbury University Press, Christchurch
 Huber, M. (2010). Compendium of bivalves. A full-color guide to 3,300 of the world's marine bivalves. A status on Bivalvia after 250 years of research. Hackenheim: ConchBooks. 901 pp., 1 CD-ROM
 Maxwell, P.A. (2009). Cenozoic Mollusca. Pp 232-254 in Gordon, D.P. (ed.) New Zealand inventory of biodiversity. Volume one. Kingdom Animalia: Radiata, Lophotrochozoa, Deuterostomia. Canterbury University Press, Christchurch.

EDxternal links
 Sowerby, G. B., III. (1877). Descriptions of six new species of shells from the collections of the Marchioness Paulucci and Dr. Prevost. Proceedings of the Zoological Society of London. 1876: 752-755, pl. 75.

Limidae
Bivalves of New Zealand
Molluscs described in 1877